Norman Delaney Bass, Jr. (born January 21, 1939) is a former American college and professional football player and baseball player.  He was a pitcher for the Kansas City Athletics from 1961 to 1963. A safety in football, he played college football at the University of the Pacific, and professionally in the American Football League for the Denver Broncos in 1964. Bass became an international table tennis player. His 2–sport athlete status came about because arthritis forced him to retire from baseball. His is the brother of NFL player Dick Bass.

Baseball career
Bass pitched in 65 games (34 starts) for the Kansas City Athletics, finishing with a 13–17 record and a 5.32 career ERA in his Major League career. In his rookie year with the Athletics he had 11 wins and 11 losses. Bass signed with the Athletics before the 1958 season and made his debut with the Pocatello A's. He worked his way to the major leagues, making his debut at age 22. As a hitter, he hit his lone major league home run in 1961. Bass pitched in one minor league game in 1965, a complete game victory, but his baseball career ended after that performance.

Football career
Bass played safety for the Denver Broncos in 1964 after arthritis cut short his 1964 baseball season. The Broncos were an American Football League team that went 2–11–1 that season, with Bass playing Defensive Back and wearing uniform number 46. From  1960 to 1969, his brother, Dick Bass, was a running back for the Los Angeles Rams.

2–Sport athlete
Bass played both football and baseball in college and joined the Denver Broncos after he was unable pitch effectively in 1964, due to arthritis. The arthritis forced him to retire from football as well. Bass is one of the few players (there are less than 70) to play both baseball and football professionally.

Table Tennis
Bass took up table tennis in the 1970s and became a ranked player in his age groups. He played for the United States Paralympic table tennis team in 1998. He won a bronze medal at the 2000 Paralympic Games in Sydney, Australia. Bass' table tennis career accomplishments led to him being elected to the Table Tennis Hall of Fame.

Personal
Bass was stricken with meningitis at age 10 and had to be quarantined for a time after the illness almost took his life. The illness left him blind and deaf for three months.

Bass followed his older brother Dick Bass in starring at Vallejo High School and attending the University of Pacific, where he was a multi–sport athlete.

In signing with the Kansas City Athletics, Bass received a $4,000 signing bonus, which he used to support his young family.

Norm Bass had a career working for McDonnell Douglas, retiring after 30 years with the company.

In 2005, Bass' son, Norman Delaney Bass, III, wrote a biography of his father. The book is titled "Color Him Father: An American Journey of Hope and Redemption." .

Bass was elected to the Table Tennis Hall of Fame in 2018.

See also
List of American Football League playersList of athletes who played in Major League Baseball and the National Football League

References

External links

Norm Bass NFL & AFL Football Statistics | Pro-Football-Reference.com

1939 births
Living people
African-American baseball players
People from Laurel, Mississippi
Pacific Tigers football players
American football safeties
Denver Broncos (AFL) players
Kansas City Athletics players
Pocatello Athletics players
Albany Senators players
Sioux City Soos players
Amarillo Gold Sox players
Portland Beavers players
El Paso Sun Kings players
Dallas Rangers players
Toronto Maple Leafs (International League) players
Major League Baseball pitchers
Table tennis players at the 2000 Summer Paralympics
Paralympic bronze medalists for the United States
Pacific Tigers baseball players
Baseball players from Mississippi
Players of American football from Mississippi
Paralympic medalists in table tennis
Medalists at the 2000 Summer Paralympics
Paralympic table tennis players of the United States
Medalists at the 2007 Parapan American Games
21st-century African-American people
20th-century African-American sportspeople